Arthur Portelance (19 March 1928 – 27 November 2008) was a Canadian businessman and politician. Portelance served as a Liberal party member of the House of Commons of Canada. He was a salesman and businessman by career.

Born in Montreal, Quebec, Portelance represented Quebec's Gamelin electoral district which he first won office in the 1968 federal election. He was re-elected there in the 1972, 1974, 1979 and 1980 federal elections.

Portelance served five successive terms from the 28th to the 32nd Canadian Parliaments. He left national politics and did not campaign in the 1984 election.

References

External links
 

1928 births
Members of the House of Commons of Canada from Quebec
Liberal Party of Canada MPs
2008 deaths